Stillwater Pond State Park is a public recreation area covering  in the town of Torrington, Connecticut. The state park surrounds Stillwater Pond, a  impoundment on the West Branch Naugatuck River. Fishing, boating, and a paved boat ramp are offered.

References

External links
Stillwater Pond State Park Connecticut Department of Energy and Environmental Protection

State parks of Connecticut
Parks in Litchfield County, Connecticut
Torrington, Connecticut